Rollin Howard (1840 - June 19, 1879) was an American minstrel performer, best known for his female blackface impersonations.

Howard was born as Ebenezer G.B. Holder in New York City around 1840, and appeared in minstrel productions from approximately 1860 to 1870. He appeared in other dramatic performances both before and after his minstrel period. After the American Civil War, female impersonators became more common in minstrel shows, and Howard was considered one of the leading performers in such roles, along with Francis Leon and Eugene d'Amelie.

 Among songs that Howard performed, he was credited with "arranging" on one of the first sheet music publications for Shoo Fly, Don't Bother Me in 1869. The song was extremely popular, and though the exact authorship is not clear, at times Howard has received some authorship credit.

References

Blackface minstrel performers
American drag queens
1879 deaths
1840 births
19th-century American singers